Twisted into Form is the second studio album by American thrash metal band Forbidden. It features one line-up change from their debut – 1988's Forbidden Evil – with Tim Calvert replacing Glen Alvelais on guitar. The result is a more melodic and progressive affair with many acoustic interludes and clearer production, but less of a raw edge than its predecessor. It is their last album with drummer Paul Bostaph before he joined Slayer in 1992 when Forbidden was on hiatus.

Track listing

1998 Century Media re-release

These are taken from The Ultimate Revenge 2.

2008 Century Media re-release

These are taken from Raw Evil: Live at the Dynamo.

Credits
 Russ Anderson – vocals
 Craig Locicero – lead guitar
 Tim Calvert – rhythm guitar
 Matt Camacho – bass
 Paul Bostaph – drums
 Death Angel, The Horde of Torment – backing vocals on "Out of Body" and "R.I.P."
 Recorded at Fantasy Studios, Berkeley, California
 Produced and engineered by Michael Rosen
 Assistant engineered for basic tracks by Mike Semanick
 Mastered by Howie Weinberg at Masterdisk
 Cover art by Kent Mathieu

References

Forbidden (band) albums
1990 albums
Combat Records albums